TomPaine.com was a website with news and opinion on United States politics from a progressive perspective, named after the political writer Thomas Paine. It featured a mixture of original articles and links to articles on other websites.

TomPaine.com was founded in 1999 by John Moyers as an independent, non-profit journal of opinion. The project became best known for its opinion advertisements — or "op ads," a term coined by Moyers — which ran almost weekly on the op-ed page of the New York Times, and also in the Weekly Standard, Roll Call, and other publications. 

Between 1999 and 2003, Moyers conceived and wrote some 120 op ads. Some of those launched national controversies and were noted, quoted, cited and/or copycatted in The New York Times, Newsweek, Time, Reuters, the Associated Press, The International Herald Tribune, Der Spiegel and dozens of other publications and Web sites; on the CBS, NBC, and ABC evening newscasts; and on numerous cable news outlets. An op ad was reprinted in a college-level textbook as an example of effective mission-driven communications. Rolling Stone dubbed TomPaine.com a "cool irritant," calling its op ads "perhaps the media's most visible outlet for apple-cart-upsetting truths about glossed-over issues." In April 2001, Alternet.org named Mr. Moyers one of six "New Media Heroes.". PC Magazine called the website "a great example of what an online journal can be.".  The Communication Workers of American and the Newspaper Guild awarded the 2003 Herbert Block Freedom Award to John Moyers and the staff of TomPaine.com for being "a consistent voice of reason and democratic discourse at a time of increased political attacks on civil liberties and a flattening of discourse in the mainstream media."

Moyers left TomPaine.com at the end of 2003 and TomPaine.com is now a project of the Institute for America's Future, a progressive thinktank.

References

External links
TomPaine.com

American political websites
Cultural depictions of Thomas Paine
Internet properties established in 1999
1999 establishments in the United States